The Fateful Day is a 1995 Iranian Islamic film based on a script of the same name by Bahram Beyzai. The film is directed by Shahram Assadi. Its cast includes many Iranian cinema stars. Wheeler W. Dixon describes it as "an enormous hit in its home country."

Beyzai's screenplay was already published as a well-known book ten years prior to when the film was made. The script was offered to Shahram Asadi in order to be made into a movie.

Plot
The story is of a Christian youth who converts to Islam for the love of a Muslim girl at the time of Husayn ibn Ali. At the wedding, he hears voices calling for help. He leaves the ceremony and takes a journey to Karbala. But he arrives after the Battle of Karbala.

Cast
 Ezzatolah Entezami as Abdullah
 Alireza Shoja Nouri 
 Mohammad-Ali Keshavarz
 Jamshid Mashayekhi
 Reza Fayazi
 Zhaleh Olov
 Mehdi Fat'hi
 Hossein Panahi
 Ladan Mostofi

Production

Awards
The film won numerous awards at the thirteenth Fajr Film Festival:

 Best Makeup
 Best Set Design
 Best Musical Score
 Best Direction of a Second Feature Film

See also
 List of Islamic films
 List of Iranian films
 Bahram Beyzai filmography

Citations

References

External links
 

Films about Islam
1994 films
1994 drama films
1990s Persian-language films
Films based on works by Bahram Beyzai
Crystal Simorgh for Best Film winners
Iranian historical films